Láhpojávri is a lake in the municipality of Kautokeino-Guovdageaidnu in Troms og Finnmark county, Norway. The  lake lies on the Finnmarksvidda plateau, the village of Láhpoluoppal lies on the southern tip of the lake.

See also
List of lakes in Norway

References

Kautokeino
Lakes of Troms og Finnmark